Cot Girek is a district in North Aceh Regency, Aceh, Indonesia.

Cot Girek has several villages, namely:
 Alue Drien
 Alue Leuhob
 Alue Seumambu
 Ara LSK Selatan
 Beurandang Asan
 Beurandang Dayah
 Beurandang Krueng
 Ceumpeudak
 Cot Girek
 Drien Dua
 Gampong Batu XII
 Gampong Trieng
 Jeulikat
 Kampung Bantan
 Kampung Tempel
 Lhok Merbo
 Lhok Reuhat
 Lueng Baro
 Matang Teungoh LS
 Meunasah U Baro
 Pucok Alue
 Seuneubok Baro
 Seupieng
 Trieng LSK Selatan
 Ulee Gampong

North Aceh Regency
Districts of Aceh